The following is a list of awards and nominations received by British actress and screenwriter Emma Thompson.

Throughout her career, she has won two Academy Awards, three BAFTA Awards, two Golden Globe Awards, and one Primetime Emmy Award. She is the only person in Academy Award history to win for both acting and writing (Best Actress for James Ivory's period drama Howards End and Best Adapted Screenplay for Sense and Sensibility), and is one of 12 actors to have received two acting nominations in the same year. Thompson has received six BAFTA nominations and ten Golden Globe nominations. For her work on television, she has received seven Emmy nominations, winning Outstanding Guest Actress in a Comedy Series for her appearance for Ellen in 1998.

Major associations

Academy Awards

BAFTA Awards

Primetime Emmy Awards

Golden Globe Awards

Grammy Awards

Independent Spirit Awards

Screen Actors Guild Awards

Miscellaneous awards

Boston Society Film Critics

Empire Awards

European Film Awards

National Board of Review

Satellite Awards

Writers Guild of America Awards

Critics awards

Miscellaneous awards

References

Lists of awards received by British actor
Awards